Abar-Kavad (also spelled Abar-Kawad; meaning "Superior is Kavad"), known in Arabic sources as Abarqubadh and Abazqubadh, was a sub-district in the Sasanian province of Meshan.

During the Muslim conquest of Persia, it was defended by a certain Faylakan. In 635 (or 637) Abar-Kavad was seized by the Arab military officer Utbah ibn Ghazwan.

Sources
 
 
 
 

Sasanian cities
Former populated places in Iraq